Arc-en-Barrois is a commune in the Haute-Marne department in the Grand Est region in northeastern France. The 18th-century French metallurgist and Encyclopédiste Étienne Jean Bouchu (1714–1773) died in Arc-en-Barrois.

Geography
The Aujon flows northwest through the middle of the commune and crosses the town.

Population

See also
Communes of the Haute-Marne department
Château d'Arc-en-Barrois

References

Communes of Haute-Marne
Burgundy